UK-414,495 is a drug developed by Pfizer for the treatment of female sexual arousal disorder. UK-414,495 acts as a potent, selective inhibitor of the enzyme neutral endopeptidase, which normally serves to break down the neuropeptide VIP. The consequent increase in VIP activity alters blood flow to the genital region leading to increased lubrication and muscle relaxation.

See also
 ABT-670
 ABT-724
 Bremelanotide
 Cabergoline
 Flibanserin
 Testosterone (patch)
 Melanotan II
 Pramipexole
 PF-219,061
 S-17092
 Tibolone

References 

Hydrolase inhibitors
Female sexual dysfunction drugs
Thiadiazoles
Carboxamides
Carboxylic acids
Aphrodisiacs
Cyclopentanes
Pfizer brands